Caren Marks (born 25 September 1963) is a German politician of the Social Democratic Party (SPD) who served as a member of the Bundestag from the state of Lower Saxony from 2002 until 2021. Since 2013, she has been serving as Parliamentary State Secretary at the Federal Ministry of Labour and Social Affairs in the government of Chancellor Angela Merkel.

She represented Hannover-Land I from 2002 to 2013.

Political career 
Marks first became a member of the Bundestag in the 2002 German federal election. She is Parliamentary State Secretary to the Federal Minister for Family Affairs, Senior Citizens, Women and Youth.

In the negotiations to form a fourth coalition government under Merkel's leadership following the 2017 federal elections, Marks was part of the working group on families, women, seniors and youth, led by Annette Widmann-Mauz, Angelika Niebler and Katarina Barley.

In July 2019, Marks announced that she would not stand in the 2021 federal elections but instead resign from active politics by the end of the parliamentary term.

References

External links 

  
 Bundestag biography 

1963 births
Living people
Members of the Bundestag for Lower Saxony
Female members of the Bundestag
21st-century German women politicians
Members of the Bundestag 2017–2021
Members of the Bundestag 2013–2017
Members of the Bundestag 2009–2013
Members of the Bundestag 2005–2009
Members of the Bundestag 2002–2005
Members of the Bundestag for the Social Democratic Party of Germany
Parliamentary State Secretaries of Germany